The Virgin and the Macho Man is a 1974 Brazilian sex comedy film directed by José Mojica Marins under the pseudonym J. Avelar. It is also Marins' first film in the pornochanchada genre.

Plot
Two doctors are called to work at a city hospital, and soon attract the attention of all the local women. When their wives discover a sexual bet has been made between their husbands and a stranger, they decide to retaliate and call the macho man for a holiday in a country house.

Cast
Aurélio Tomassini, Esperança Villanueva, Walter C. Portella, Vosmarline Siqueira, Alex Delamotte, Lisa Negri, Augusto de Cervantes, Gracinda Fernandes, Eddio Smani, Chaguinha

References

External links
A Virgem e o Machão Official site
A Virgem e o MachãoPortal Brasileiro de Cinema
A Virgem e o Machão at IMDb
A Virgem e o Machão Meu Cinema Brasileiro

1974 films
Films directed by José Mojica Marins
1970s Portuguese-language films
1970s sex comedy films
Pornochanchada
1974 comedy films